The Royal Natal Yacht Club is located in Durban, South Africa, and was established in 1858. It is the oldest yacht club in Africa. and southern hemisphere.

See also
 List of yacht clubs

References

Further reading

External links
 Rnyc.org.za

Royal yacht clubs
Yacht clubs in South Africa